Taipei Futsal Association (TPFSA) was established by the Taipei City Government in Taipei, Taiwan, on 14 January 2006. Its purpose is to promote futsal activities and to make relating development plans.

See also
Taipei Football Association
Damien Knabben Cup

2006 establishments in Taiwan
Sports organizations established in 2006
Futsal in Taiwan
Futsal organizations
Futsal Association
Futsal
Sports governing bodies in Taiwan